Copadichromis is a genus of haplochromine cichlids endemic to Lake Malawi in Eastern Africa. Copadichromis are part of a group known as utaka and are popular with aquarists, as this genus is relatively peaceful in captivity compared to the mbuna.

Species
There are currently 25 recognized species in this genus:
 Copadichromis atripinnis Stauffer & Te. Sato, 2002
 Copadichromis azureus Konings, 1990
 Copadichromis borleyi (Iles, 1960) (redfin hap, goldfin hap)
 Copadichromis chizumuluensis Stauffer & Konings, 2006
 Copadichromis chrysonotus (Boulenger, 1908)
 Copadichromis cyaneus (Trewavas, 1935)
 Copadichromis cyanocephalus Stauffer & Konings, 2006
 Copadichromis diplostigma Stauffer & Konings, 2006
 Copadichromis geertsi Konings, 1999
 Copadichromis ilesi Konings, 1999
 Copadichromis insularis Stauffer & Konings, 2006
 Copadichromis jacksoni (Iles, 1960)
 Copadichromis likomae (Iles, 1960)
 Copadichromis mbenjii Konings, 1990 (Quads Hap)
 Copadichromis melas Stauffer & Konings, 2006
 Copadichromis mloto (Iles, 1960)
 Copadichromis nkatae (Iles, 1960)
 Copadichromis parvus Stauffer & Konings, 2006
 Copadichromis pleurostigma (Trewavas, 1935)
 Copadichromis pleurostigmoides (Iles, 1960)
 Copadichromis quadrimaculatus (Regan, 1922)
 Copadichromis trewavasae Konings, 1999
 Copadichromis trimaculatus (Iles, 1960) (Verduya's hap)
 Copadichromis verduyni Konings, 1990
 Copadichromis virginalis (Iles, 1960)

In addition, several local populations are known. Most are probably colour morphs or at best subspecies. But some seem to be distinct species, such as:
 Copadichromis sp. 'Virginalis Kajose'

References

 

Cichlid genera
Taxa named by David Henry Eccles
Taxa named by Ethelwynn Trewavas